Greene County Schools or Greene County School District may refer to:

 Greene County School District (Alabama)
 Greene County School District (Georgia)
 Greene County Community School District in Iowa
 Greene County School District (Mississippi)
 Greene County Schools (North Carolina)
 Greene County Schools (Tennessee)
 Greene County Public Schools in Virginia
 Greene County Tech School District in Arkansas